The Ministry of Natural Resources and Tourism is the government ministry of Tanzania that is responsible for the management of natural resources and cultural resources and for the development of the tourism industry.  It has a wide range of investments in various tourist resources and tourism industry projects.  Ministry offices are located in Dodoma. Dr. Damas Ndumbaro is the new Tourism Minister of Tanzania.

The Ministry's motto is "Tanzania Unforgettable
".

Organization
The work of the Ministry is organized into four basic workgroups:
Antiquities
Tourism
Wildlife
Forestry and beekeeping

In addition, there are various support and administration divisions within the ministry.

See also
Tourism in Tanzania

References

External links
 

Natural Resources and Tourism
Environment of Tanzania
Tanzania, Natural Resources and Tourism, Ministry
Tanzania, Natural Resources and Tourism, Ministry
Tanzania
Tourism in Tanzania
Tanzania, Natural Resources and Tourism, Ministry
Tanzania, Natural Resources and Tourism, Ministry
Tanzania, Natural Resources and Tourism, Ministry